Salvador Arturo Coreas Pérez  (born September 29, 1984, in San Miguel, El Salvador) is a Salvadoran footballer who currently plays for second division side  Municipal Limeño.

He is the older brother of El Salvador national under-20 football team member and former Vista Hermosa player Raúl Antonio Coreas.

Club career
Nicknamed Chamba, Coreas made his professional debut at Salvadoran giants Águila and had two spells at Atlético Balboa before joining Vista Hermosa. In 2009, he moved to Municipal Limeño. He was ruled out by a ligament injury for the major part of the 2010 Clausura.

International career
Coreas received his first call up to the national team in January 2008. He officially received his first cap on January 22, 2008, in a friendly match against Belize. He went on to win 36 caps, scoring no goals. He has represented his country in 12 FIFA World Cup qualification matches and played at the 2009 UNCAF Nations Cup and at the 2009 CONCACAF Gold Cup.

His most recent international game was an October 2009 FIFA World Cup qualification match against Mexico.

References

External links
 Profile - El Gráfico 
 

1984 births
Living people
People from San Miguel, El Salvador
Association football midfielders
Salvadoran footballers
El Salvador international footballers
2009 UNCAF Nations Cup players
2009 CONCACAF Gold Cup players
C.D. Águila footballers
Atlético Balboa footballers
C.D. Vista Hermosa footballers